Bahaa el-Din Ahmed Hussein el-Akkad (born 1949) is an Egyptian former Muslim imam who converted to Christianity. For more than 20 years, el-Akkad is a member of the fundamentalist Islamic group Da'wa el Tabligh, which actively proselytized non-Muslims but strictly opposed violence. He also led a mosque community in Al-Haram in the Giza area adjacent to Cairo. In 1994, he published Islam: The Religion, a 500-page book reviewing the traditional beliefs and dogmas of Islam. He later became disillusioned with Islam and began to question certain Islamic tenets. A theological discourse with a Christian led him to conduct an intensive study of Christian scripture, after which he converted to Christianity in January 2005. 

On 6 April 2005, el-Akkad was arrested by the Egyptian State Security Intelligence (SSI) on suspicions of blasphemy. He was accused of "insulting the heavenly religion [of Islam]", a misdemeanor under Article 98F of the Egyptian penal code. Although his release by a court in Cairo on 30 July 2006 was issued, the SSI deliberately ignored this decision and transferred el-Akkad to the maximum security Wadi el-Natroun Prison, where the majority of Egyptian Islamists sentenced for anti-government activities are incarcerated. He was finally released from prison on 28 April 2007, after having been held without charges for two years.

References

See also
Human rights in Egypt
Egyptian identification card controversy

1949 births
Living people
Coptic Orthodox Christians from Egypt
Converts to Oriental Orthodoxy from Islam
Egyptian former Muslims
21st-century Oriental Orthodox Christians